WHRM (90.9 FM) is a radio station licensed to Wausau, Wisconsin, serving the Wausau/Stevens Point area. The station is part of Wisconsin Public Radio (WPR), and airs WPR's "NPR News and Classical Network", consisting of classical music and news and talk programming.  WHRM also broadcasts regional news and programming from studios in the Center for Civic Engagement at the University of Wisconsin-Stevens Point at Wausau.

The station signed on as WHSF, the fourth FM station in what would become Wisconsin Public Radio.

HD Radio
WRHM airs Ideas Network programming on its third HD Radio subchannel–the first such arrangement in the WPR network. This is because most of north-central Wisconsin does not have a clear 24-hour signal from the Ideas Network. Sister station WLBL-AM in Auburndale must reduce its power to an all-but unlistenable level at night, while  WLBL-FM in Wausau is maintained under a time-share arrangement with WXPW which splits that signal's time among the two organizations. In September 2017, the WHRM-HD3 signal began to be translated full-time as an analog signal over W267BB (101.3) in the Wausau area.

The network's HD2 Classical Service is aired on WHRM-HD2.

See also Wisconsin Public Radio

External links
Wisconsin Public Radio

HRM
Wisconsin Public Radio
Classical music radio stations in the United States
NPR member stations